Catherine Haena Kim (born May 19, 1984) is an American actress and model, best known as Emma Hill in the ABC television series The Company You Keep. Kim has acted in several projects, including Ballers, Good Trouble, FBI, and Boyfriends of Christmas Past.

Early life 
Kim was born in New York City, to Korean immigrant parents. Her first experience with acting was as a fourth grader, when she performed in her elementary school's production of William Shakespeare's The Tempest. 

In 2006, Kim graduated from the University of Virginia with a degree in psychology and a minor in drama. Prior to declaring a major, she planned to double major in business and French. Kim was granted the title of Miss Virginia in the Miss United States pageant before starting her career.

Career 
Kim has guest starred in several television series, including Gossip Girl, 90210, and Mistresses. She rose to fame in 2019 with the television series Ballers and FBI. In 2021, she was cast in a recurring role as Nicolette Baptiste in Good Trouble.

In 2023, Kim began starring opposite Milo Ventimiglia in the drama television series The Company You Keep, based on the South Korean television series My Fellow Citizens!.

Filmography

Film

TV

References

External links 
 
 

American actresses of Korean descent
American people of South Korean descent
Actresses from New York (state)
People from Queens, New York
American film actresses
American television actresses
21st-century American actresses
University of Virginia alumni

1984 births
Living people